Wesley Keith Fogden (born 12 April 1988) is an English professional footballer who plays as a midfielder for Poole Town F.C.

Club career

Brighton & Hove Albion
Fogden started his career at Brighton & Hove Albion in July 2004, breaking into the first-team in 2007 and making a total of 3 league appearances. Aged just 18, he discovered he had a tumour that was eating into his spine; Fogden underwent successful surgery shortly after and spent three months in a restrictive body cast before working his way back to fitness.

After being fully recovered from tumour, Fogden joined Dorchester Town on loan in early October 2007. After being recalled in December, he joined Bognor Regis Town in the same predicament in April 2008. Fogden made a combined total of 15 league appearances and scored 2 goals.

Dorchester Town
In August 2008 Fogden re-joined Dorchester Town, initially on loan, but the move was made permanent in the following month. He made 21 league appearances and scored 4 goals.

Havant & Waterlooville
Fogden's spell at Dorchester didn't last long and in February 2009 he joined Havant & Waterlooville. After scoring 29 goals in 105 league appearances, Fogden became a firm fan's favourite due to his consistent shining performances. Whilst at the club, he joined on a sports coaching and PE course at the University of Chichester. Fogden set a record by becoming the first Hawks player to not only win the Player of the Month award for the third month in a row, but also for accumulating a total of four awards across the nine given out through a single season.

AFC Bournemouth
On 6 October 2011, Fogden joined AFC Bournemouth on loan. On 23 February 2012 he signed a permanent three-and-a-half-year contract with the Cherries. In the following month Fogden scored the game's only goal against Brentford into the top left corner of the goal.

Fogden missed the last few games of the 2011–12 season due to a shoulder injury. It was later announced that he would be out of action for six months. On 1 September 2012, Fogden made his first appearance of the season replacing Eunan O'Kane at Sheffield United in the 5–3 defeat. Fogden became a regular in Paul Groves' side before he was sacked. After the return of Eddie Howe Fogden lost his place in a competitive team to his teammates. Fogden scored his first goal of the season in the FA Cup first round tie against Dagenham & Redbridge FC coming on as a sub and scoring in injury time. He then scored in the second-round game against Carlisle United and provided Eunan O'Kane with a goal.

Howe credited Fogden as their unsung hero this season as some of his impressive performances in some unnatural positions has saved the team on various occasions. Fogden started the 2013–14 season injured with Howe wanting to convert him into a full-back. However, he did not feature for the club in the season, and was released in January 2014.

Portsmouth
On 15 January 2014, Fogden joined Portsmouth in an 18-month deal.

His first goal for the club came under caretaker manager Andy Awford, in a relegation match against struggling Bristol Rovers. Twice in the first half Portsmouth took the lead and were pegged back by a dogged Rovers side fighting for their lives. However, in the 70th minute Wes Fogden popped up to poke in the winner for Portsmouth, in front of the Fratton End, after coming on as a second-half substitute, much to the delight of the 17,000 or so Portsmouth fans in the sold out Fratton Park.

Yeovil Town
After leaving Portsmouth at the end of his contract, Fogden signed for League Two side Yeovil Town on a two-year deal on 17 July 2015.

After struggling with injury, Fogden was released by Yeovil on 16 May 2016, despite having a year left on his contract.

Havant & Waterlooville
On 13 July 2016, Fogden signed for his old club Havant & Waterlooville in the Isthmian Premier League on a two-year contract. Wes admitted the time was right to step out of full-time football to protect his body from serious damage due to suffering from a persistent knee injury.

On 13 March 2018, Fogden celebrated his 200th appearance for Havant & Waterlooville in the 1–0 win over Wealdstone.

Fogden helped the club achieve back to back titles, winning promotion to the National League the highest in the club's history. Wes also won the Hawk's Player of the season award along with making it into the National League South team of the season for the 2017/18 season.

Personal life

Fogden is close friends with Shaun MacDonald and Marc Pugh, both former teammates from his time spent at AFC Bournemouth.

Fogden also works as a Project Manager for Elite Skills Arena based in Poole, Dorset.

Career statistics

References

External links

1988 births
Living people
Footballers from Brighton
English footballers
Association football midfielders
Brighton & Hove Albion F.C. players
Dorchester Town F.C. players
Bognor Regis Town F.C. players
Havant & Waterlooville F.C. players
AFC Bournemouth players
Yeovil Town F.C. players
Portsmouth F.C. players
Dorking Wanderers F.C. players
English Football League players
Isthmian League players
National League (English football) players